Gate is an unincorporated community in Thurston County, Washington, United States.

History

The community was established in 1881 and platted in 1890. The Northern Pacific Railway built a junction in Gate, and the town developed a lumber industry. The community was named Gate due to the railroad junction, which made it the "gateway to the coast". Much of the town was devastated by fires in the early 1900s, and the decline of the area's lumber mills further hurt Gate's economy.

Arts and culture
The Gate School, which is listed on the National Register of Historic Places, is located in Gate.

Parks and recreation
The community is a trailhead for the Gate to Belmore Trail, a country-maintained rail trail.

The Mima Mounds Natural Area Preserve, declared a National Natural Landmark, is northeast of Gate. Other nearby protected areas include the Glacial Heritage Preserve and the Black River Habitat Management Area. The community lies near the border of Capitol State Forest.

References

Unincorporated communities in Thurston County, Washington
Unincorporated communities in Washington (state)
Populated places established in 1881
1881 establishments in Washington Territory